Tur Turek is a Polish football club based in Turek, Poland.

After reformation in 2015, the club won three promotions in a row, however fell into financial trouble in February 2020 and the senior team was withdrawn from the fifth division; the whole youth team structure however has remained intact and continues to operate.

References

External links

 Tur Turek at 90minut.pl

Association football clubs established in 1921
Turek County
Football clubs in Greater Poland Voivodeship
1921 establishments in Poland